Aaron Frederick "Fred" Rasmussen Jr. (May 27, 1915, St. Anthony, Idaho – March 17, 1984, Los Angeles) was an American physician, professor of microbiology and immunology, and, later in his career, associate dean of the UCLA School of Medicine. He is known for his pioneering research in psychoneuroimmunology.

Biography
He graduated in 1937 with a B.S. from the University of Idaho. At the University of Wisconsin–Madison, he graduated in 1940 with an M.S. and in 1941 with a Ph.D. in medical bacteriology. He received his M.D. in 1944 from the University of Wisconsin School of Medicine and Public Health, where he was a research associate from 1941 to 1942 and an instructor from 1942 to 1943. From 1944 to 1948 he served as an officer in the United States Army Medical Corps. From 1947 to 1948 in Washington, D.C., he was the chief of the chemotherapy research section of the department of viral and rickettsial diseases at the Army Medical Center (which in 1953 was renamed the Walter Reed Army Institute of Research).

From 1948 to 1952 at the University of Wisconsin School of Medicine and Public Health, Rasmussen was an associate professor and then a full professor of medical microbiology and preventive medicine. At the UCLA School of Medicine (now named the David Geffen School of Medicine at UCLA), he was appointed in 1952  a full professor in the Department of infectious diseases (which became the department of microbiology and immunology) and chief of the department's virology section. He chaired the department from 1962 to 1969. In 1953 he was appointed to the staff of the City of Hope Cancer Research Institute. In 1969 at the UCLA School of Medicine, he was appointed associate dean, a position he held until his sudden, unexpected death in 1984 from an acute pulmonary embolism.

Rasmussen's 1957 paper Increased susceptibility to herpes simplex in mice subjected to avoidance-Learning stress or restraint, coauthored by James T. Marsh and Norman Q. Brill, and his 1969 paper Emotion and immunity have foundational roles in psychoneuroimmunology. In the late 1950s and throughout the 1960s, Rasmussen and his colleagues investigated the effects of emotional stress in animal models for various viral infections, such as herpes simplex, Coxsackie B, vesicular stomatitis, poliomyelitis, and polyoma.

For the academic year 1960–1961, he was on sabbatical as a visiting scientist at the United States Naval Research Unit 2 in Tapei. During his sabbatical year he found that the influenza virus that caused the 1957–1958 influenza pandemic was closely related to at least 4 different influenza viruses occurring in Asia among pigs, ducks, chickens, and horses.

Rasmussen was elected in 1953 a fellow of the American Association for the Advancement of Science. He was the president of the American Society for Microbiology for the academic year 1972–1973.

In 1941 he married Besse Mabel Tatum (1913–1982). They had a son and two daughters. Their son, Frederick Tatum Rasmussen (1943–2020), became a lawyer and partner at several law firms in Seattle.

Selected publications

References

1915 births
1984 deaths
American microbiologists
American immunologists
American virologists
20th-century American physicians
University of Idaho alumni
University of Wisconsin–Madison alumni
University of Wisconsin School of Medicine and Public Health alumni
David Geffen School of Medicine at UCLA faculty
Fellows of the American Association for the Advancement of Science
People from St. Anthony, Idaho